Raymond Leblanc (22 May 1915 – 21 March 2008) was a Belgian comic book publisher, film director and film producer, best known for publishing works such as The Adventures of Tintin by Hergé and Blake and Mortimer by Edgar P. Jacobs.  He debuted, published, and promoted many of the most famous Franco-Belgian comics.  Leblanc and his two partners created Le Lombard publishing, Tintin magazine, PubliArt advertising agency, and Belvision Studios.

Biography 
Raymond Leblanc was a resistance fighter during the Second World War in the Mouvement National Royaliste (MNR) group.
When the war ended in 1945, Leblanc set up new offices at 55 rue du Lombard, establishing his publishing house, Le Lombard.  Years later after Leblanc's retirement, he explained in an interview the beginnings of the Tintin legacy. On the subject of creating a new magazine for young people, he said, "We thought this was an interesting idea, and started looking for a name. We ended up eventually with Tintin, Hergé’s comic book hero. Literally everyone knew that character at that moment. The question however was, where was Hergé?"

The Adventures of Tintin creator Hergé, having worked for the collaborationist newspaper Le Soir, was out of a job and even denied the right to work.
Leblanc arranged a meeting with Hergé, understood his dilemma, and saw an opportunity.  Leblanc offered to clear Hergé's name and, that settled, offered him a new publishing venue for The Adventures of Tintin: the opportunity to continue to serialise his title in Leblanc's new weekly 12-page, comics journal,  (Tintin magazine), the first project of Le Lombard.  Hergé accepted, and in 1946, Belgian comics fans were treated, not only to the return of Tintin, but to the debut of many new Franco-Belgian comics on a weekly basis, some appearing in Hergé's signature  style.

The years 1954 and 1956 saw Leblanc launching two other creative ventures: the advertising agency PubliArt, a publicity division of Le Lombard using comics characters in its projects, and Belvision Studios, which produced short and full-length animated films for television and cinema. Belvision rose to become a major animation studio, producing such works as Hergé's Adventures of Tintin, Pinocchio in Outer Space, Tintin and the Temple of the Sun, Tintin and the Lake of Sharks (which he directed), and Les Voyages de Gulliver.

Leblanc continued to helm new projects at his companies until his retirement. He sold to French buyers in 1986.

He received the Alph-Art d'Honneur prize in 2003 at the 30th annual Angoulême International Comics Festival, in Angoulême, France, for his contribution to the Franco-Belgian comics industry. (See photo of Leblanc accepting the honour, age 87.)
Leblanc died aged 92 on 21 March 2008 in Brussels, Belgium.

Notes

References

External links 
Official website of Raymond Leblanc foundation
The Telegraph: Raymond Leblanc: Publisher of Tintin magazine
Guardian: Raymond Leblanc, Enthusiast who enabled Tintin to make a postwar return to publication 
Online Memorial
Forbidden Planet Blog Log: Raymond Leblanc’s nine lives

1915 births
2008 deaths
Belgian publishers (people)
Belgian magazine publishers (people)
Belgian resistance members
Belgian film directors
Belgian film producers
Belgian animated film directors
Belgian animated film producers
Comic book publishers (people)
Tintin
People from Neufchâteau, Luxembourg Province